Bontecou is a surname. Notable people with the surname include:

Eleanor Bontecou (1891–1976), American lawyer, civil rights advocate, and government official
Frederic H. Bontecou (1893–1959), American farmer and politician 
Lee Bontecou (born 1931), American artist
Reed Brockway Bontecou (1824–1907), American Civil War surgeon

See also
Bontekoe